Edward J. "Ned" Canfield (born November 6, 1955) is a former Republican member of the Michigan House of Representatives for Tuscola and Huron counties.

Biography 
Canfield was born in Howell in November 1955 and raised on his family's farm in Fowlerville. Canfield graduated from high school in 1973 and enlisted in the United States Navy two years later. After five years as a hospital corpsman, Canfield was honorably discharged.

He earned a degree in biological sciences from what was then Lake Superior State College (now-University) in 1983 and graduated from Michigan State University with a doctorate in osteopathic medicine in 1988. Canfield practiced medicine in Lansing from 1989 to 1992, then opened a family practice in Sebewaing with his wife which he sold to Covenant Healthcare in 2010. He currently is a family physician in Caro.

Canfield previously ran as an independent for the House in 2012 and lost.

References

1955 births
Living people
People from Howell, Michigan
People from Fowlerville, Michigan
Lake Superior State University alumni
Michigan State University alumni
Physicians from Michigan
Michigan Independents
Michigan Republicans
Members of the Michigan House of Representatives
21st-century American politicians
People from Livingston County, Michigan
People from Caro, Michigan
United States Navy corpsmen